Time Right Deadly is a 1956 thriller novel by the British writer Sarah Gainham. Her debut novel, it was shortlisted for the Gold Dagger Award, losing out to Edward Grierson's The Second Man. Like many of her novels it takes place in post-war Austria, where she lived.

References

Bibliography
 Burton, Alan. Historical Dictionary of British Spy Fiction. Rowman & Littlefield, 2016.
 Hicken, Mandy & Prytherch, Raymond John. Now Read on: A Guide to Contemporary Popular Fiction. Scolar Press, 1994.
 Reilly, John M. Twentieth Century Crime & Mystery Writers. Springer, 2015.

1956 British novels
Novels by Sarah Gainham
British thriller novels
Novels set in Austria
Arthur Barker Limited books